1,4-Thiazepine is a thiazepine. Diltiazem is based upon this structure.

References 

Thiazepines